Arry is a commune in the Somme department in Hauts-de-France in northern France.

Geography
The commune is situated about 1 kilometre from the A16 autoroute, on the D938 road to Rue.

Population

Monument aux morts

The monument aux morts in this commune features a sculpture by Louis-Henri Leclabart. A montage of photographs of this monument aux morts, which stands in front of the church, is shown below.

See also
Communes of the Somme department
War memorials (Western Somme)

References

Communes of Somme (department)